Anatrachyntis pyrrhodes is a moth in the family Cosmopterigidae. It was described by Edward Meyrick in 1897, and is known from Australia.

References

Moths described in 1897
Anatrachyntis
Moths of Australia